Sasikanth Manipatruni is an American engineer and inventor in the fields of Computer engineering, Integrated circuit technology and semiconductor device fabrication. Manipatruni contributed to developments in silicon photonics, spintronics and quantum materials.

Manipatruni is a co-author of 50 research papers and ~400 patents (cited about 7500 times ) in the areas of electro-optic modulators, Cavity optomechanics, nanophotonics & optical interconnects, spintronics, and new logic devices for extension of Moore's law. His work has appeared in Nature, Nature Physics, Nature communications, Science advances and Physical Review Letters.

Early life and education 
Manipatruni received a bachelor's degree in Electrical Engineering and Physics from IIT Delhi in 2005 where he graduated with the institute silver medal. He also completed research under the Kishore Vaigyanik Protsahan Yojana at Indian Institute of Science working at Inter-University Centre for Astronomy and Astrophysics and in Hybrid automaton at ETH Zurich.

Research career  
Manipatruni received his Ph.D. in Electrical Engineering with minor in applied engineering physics from Cornell University. The title of his thesis was "Scaling silicon nanophotonic interconnects : silicon electrooptic modulators, slowlight & optomechanical devices". His thesis advisors were Michal Lipson and Alexander Gaeta at Cornell University. He has co-authored academic research with Michal Lipson, Alexander Gaeta, Keren Bergman, Ramamoorthy Ramesh, Lane W. Martin, Naresh Shanbhag, Jian-Ping Wang, Paul McEuen, Christopher J. Hardy, Felix Casanova, Ehsan Afshari, Jacob T. Robinson spanning Condensed matter physics, Electronics and devices, Photonics, Circuit theory, Computer architecture and hardware for Artificial intelligence areas.

Research in silicon optical links 
Manipatruni's PhD thesis was focused on developing the then nascent field of silicon photonics by progressively scaling the speed of electro-optic modulation from 1 GHz to 12.5 Gbit/s, 18 Gbit/s  and 50 Gbit/s on a single physical optical channel driven by a silicon photonic component. The significance of silicon for optical uses can be understood as follows: nearly 95% of modern Integrated circuit technology is based on silicon-based semiconductors which have high productivity in Semiconductor device fabrication due to the use of large single crystal wafers and extra-ordinary control of the quality of the interfaces. However, Photonic integrated circuits are still majorly manufactured using III-V compound semiconductor materials and II-VI semiconductor compound materials, who's engineering lags silicon industry by several decades (judged by number of wafers and devices produced per year). By showing that silicon can be used as a material to turn light signal on and off, silicon electro-optic modulators allow for use of high-quality engineering developed for the electronics industry to be adopted for photonics/optics industry. This the foundational argument used by silicon electro-optics researchers. This work was paralleled closely at leading industrial research groups at Intel, IBM  and Luxtera  during 2005–2010 with industry adopting and improving various methods developed at academic research labs. Manipatruni's work showed that it is practically possible to develop free carrier injection modulators (in contrast to carrier depletion modulators) to reach high speed modulation by engineering injection of free carriers via pre-amplification and back-to-back connected injection mode devices.

In combination with Keren Bergman at Columbia University, micro-ring modulator research led to demonstration of a number of firsts in long-distance uses of silicon photonics utilizing silicon based injection mode electro-optic modulators including first demonstration of long-haul transmission using silicon microring modulators first Error-free transmission of microring-modulated BPSK, First Demonstration of 80-km Long-Haul Transmission of 12.5-Gb/s Data Using Silicon Microring Resonator Electro-Optic Modulator, First Experimental Bit-Error-Rate Validation of 12.5-Gb/s Silicon Modulator Enabling Photonic Networks-on-Chip. These academic results have been applied into products widely deployed at Cisco, Intel.

Application of optical links for computing and medical imaging 
Manipatruni, Lipson and collaborators at Intel have projected a roadmap that required the use of Silicon micro-ring modulators to meet the bandwidth, linear bandwidth density (bandwidth/cross section length) and area bandwidth density (bandwidth/area) of on-die communication links. While originally considered thermally unstable, by early 2020's micro-ring modulators have received wide adoption for computing needs at Intel  Ayar Labs, Global foundries  and varied optical interconnect usages.

The optimal energy of an on-die optical link is written  as : where is the optimal detector voltage (maintaining the bit error rate),  detector capacitance,  is the modulator drive voltage,  are the electrooptic volume of the optical cavity being stabilized, refractive index change to carrier concentration and spectral sensitivity of the device to refractive index change   is the change in optical transmission, B is the bandwidth of the link , Ptune the power to keep the resonator operational and B the bandwidth of the link at F frequency of the data being serialized.

Manipatruni and Christopher J. Hardy applied integrated photonic links to the Magnetic resonance imaging to improve the signal collection rate from the MRI machines via the signal collection coils  while working at the General Electric's GE Global Research facility. The use of optical transduction of the MRI signals can allow significantly higher signal collection arrays within the MRI system increasing the signal throughput, reducing the time to collect the image and overall reduction of the weight of the coils and cost of MRI imaging by reducing the imaging time.

Research in cavity optomechanics and optical radiation pressure
Manipatruni proposed the first observation that optical radiation pressure leads to non-reciprocity in micro cavity opto-mechanics in 2009  in the classical electro-magnetic domain without the use of magnetic isolators. In classical Newtonian optics, it was understood that light rays must be able to retrace their path through a given combination of optical media. However, once the momentum of light is taken into account inside a movable media this need not be true in all cases. This work  proposed that breaking of the reciprocity (i.e properties of media for forward and backward moving light can be violated) is observable in microscale optomechanical systems due to their small mass, low mechanical losses and high amplification of light due to long confinement times.

Later work has established the breaking of reciprocity in a number of nanophotonic conditions including time modulation and parametric effects in cavities. Manipatruni and Lipson have also applied the nascent devices in silicon photonics to optical synchronization  and generation of non-classical beams of light using optical non-linearities.

Memory and Spintronic devices

Manipatruni worked on Spintronics for the development of logic computing devices for computational nodes beyond the existing limits to silicon-based transistors. He developed an extended modified nodal analysis that uses vector circuit theory  for spin-based currents and voltages using modified nodal analysis which allows the use of spin components inside VLSI designs used widely in the industry. The circuit modeling is based on theoretical work by Supriyo Datta and Gerrit E. W. Bauer. Manipatruni's spin circuit models were extensively applied for development of spin logic circuits, spin interconnects, domain wall interconnects and benchmarking logic and memory devices utilizing spin and magnetic circuits.

In 2011, utilizing the discovery of Spin Hall effect and Spin–orbit interaction in heavy metals from Robert Buhrman, Daniel Ralph  and Ioan Miron in Period 6 element transition metals  Manipatruni proposed an integrated spin-hall effect memory (Later named Spin-Orbit Memory to comprehend the complex interplay of interface and bulk components of the spin current generation) combined with modern Fin field-effect transistor transistors to address the growing difficulty with embedded Static random-access memory in modern Semiconductor process technology. SOT-MRAM for SRAM replacement spurred significant research and development leading to successful demonstration of SOT-MRAM combined with Fin field-effect transistors in 22 nm process and 14 nm process at various foundries.

Working with Jian-Ping Wang, Manipatruni and collaborators were able to show evidence of a 4th elemental ferro-magnet. Given the rarity of ferro-magnetic materials in elemental form at room temperature, use of a less rare element can help with the adoption of permanent magnet based driven systems for electric vehicles.

Computational Logic Devices and Quantum materials 
In 2016, Manipatruni and collaborators proposed a number of changes to the new logic device development by identifying the core criterion for the logic devices for utilization beyond the 2 nm process. The continued slow down the Moore's law as evidenced by slow down of the voltage scaling, lithographic node scaling and increasing cost per wafer and complexity of the fabs indicated that Moore's law as it existed in the 2000-2010 era has changed to a less aggressive scaling paradigm. 

Manipatruni proposed  that spintronic and multiferroic systems are leading candidates for achieving attojoule-class logic gates for computing, thereby enabling the continuation of Moore's law for transistor scaling. However, shifting the materials focus of computing towards oxides and topological materials requires a holistic approach addressing energy, stochasticity and complexity.

The Manipaturni FOM for computational quantum materials is defined as the ratio of "  energy to switch a device at room temperature" to " energy of thermodynamic stability of the materials compared to vacuum energy, where  is the reversal of the order parameter such as ferro-electric polarization or magnetization of the material"

This ratio is universally optimal for a ferro-electric material and compared favorably to spintronic and CMOS switching elements such as MOS transistors and BJTs. The framework (adopted by SIA decadal plan) describes a unified computing framework that uses physical scaling (physics based improvement in device energy and density), mathematical scaling (using information theoretic improvements to allow higher error rate as devices scale to thermodynamic limits) and complexity scaling (architectural scaling that moves from distinct memory & logic units to AI based architectures). Combining Shannon inspired computing allows the physical stochastic errors inherent in highly scaled devices to be mitigated by information theoretic techniques.  
Magneto-Electric Spin-Orbit logic is a logic technology that utilized this methodology developing a new logic device that couples magneto-electric effect and spin orbit effects. Compared to CMOS, MESO circuits require less energy for switching, have lower operating voltage and feature a higher integration density, making them potential candidates to replace CMOS based devices in the future.

Selected publications and patents
Manipatruni, S., Nikonov, D.E., Lin, C.C., Gosavi, T.A., Liu, H., Prasad, B., Huang, Y.L., Bonturim, E., Ramesh, R. and Young, I.A., 2019. Scalable energy-efficient magnetoelectric spin–orbit logic. Nature, 565(7737), pp. 35–42.
Manipatruni, S., Nikonov, D.E. and Young, I.A., 2018. Beyond CMOS computing with spin and polarization. Nature Physics, 14(4), pp. 338–343
Manipatruni, S., Nikonov, D.E. and Young, I.A., 2014. Energy-delay performance of giant spin Hall effect switching for dense magnetic memory. Applied Physics Express, 7(10), p. 103001.
Manipatruni, S., Nikonov, D.E. and Young, I.A., 2012. Modeling and design of spintronic integrated circuits. IEEE Transactions on Circuits and Systems I: Regular Papers, 59(12), pp. 2801–2814.
Pham, V.T., Groen, I., Manipatruni, S., Choi, W.Y., Nikonov, D.E., Sagasta, E., Lin, C.C., Gosavi, T.A., Marty, A., Hueso, L.E. and Young, I.A., 2020. Spin–orbit magnetic state readout in scaled ferromagnetic/heavy metal nanostructures. Nature Electronics, 3(6), pp. 309–315.
Chen, Z., Chen, Z., Kuo, C.Y., Tang, Y., Dedon, L.R., Li, Q., Zhang, L., Klewe, C., Huang, Y.L., Prasad, B. and Farhan, A., 2018. Complex strain evolution of polar and magnetic order in multiferroic BiFeO3 thin films. Nature communications, 9(1), pp. 1–9.
Xu, Q., Manipatruni, S., Schmidt, B., Shakya, J. and Lipson, M., 2007. 12.5 Gbit/s carrier-injection-based silicon micro-ring silicon modulators. Optics express, 15(2), pp. 430–436.
Manipatruni, S., Nikonov, D.E., Lin, C.C., Prasad, B., Huang, Y.L., Damodaran, A.R., Chen, Z., Ramesh, R. and Young, I.A., 2018. Voltage control of unidirectional anisotropy in ferromagnet-multiferroic system. Science advances, 4(11), p.eaat4229.
Zhang, M., Wiederhecker, G.S., Manipatruni, S., Barnard, A., McEuen, P. and Lipson, M., 2012. Synchronization of micromechanical oscillators using light. Physical review letters, 109(23), p. 233906.
Manipatruni, S., Robinson, J.T. and Lipson, M., 2009. Optical nonreciprocity in optomechanical structures. Physical review letters, 102(21), p. 213903.
Fang, M.Y.S., Manipatruni, S., Wierzynski, C., Khosrowshahi, A. and DeWeese, M.R., 2019. Design of optical neural networks with component imprecisions. Optics Express, 27(10), pp. 14009–14029.
Chen, L., Preston, K., Manipatruni, S. and Lipson, M., 2009. Integrated GHz silicon photonic interconnect with micrometer-scale modulators and detectors. Optics express, 17(17), pp. 15248–15256.
Dutt, A., Luke, K., Manipatruni, S., Gaeta, A.L., Nussenzveig, P. and Lipson, M., 2015. On-chip optical squeezing. Physical Review Applied, 3(4), p. 044005.

AI and in-memory computing
Korgaonkar, K., Bhati, I., Liu, H., Gaur, J., Manipatruni, S., Subramoney, S., Karnik, T., Swanson, S., Young, I. and Wang, H., 2018, June. Density tradeoffs of non-volatile memory as a replacement for SRAM based last level cache. In 2018 ACM/IEEE 45th Annual International Symposium on Computer Architecture (ISCA) (pp. 315–327). IEEE.
Pipeline circuit architecture to provide in-memory computation functionality, US20190057050A1 
Low synch dedicated accelerator with in-memory computation capability, US20190056885A1 
In-memory analog neural cache, US20190057304A1,

See also
Michal Lipson
Christopher J. Hardy
Keren Bergman
Silicon photonics
Magneto-Electric Spin-Orbit logic

References 

American engineers
Cornell University alumni
American computer scientists
Scientists from Andhra Pradesh
Telugu people
21st-century American engineers
Indian company founders
Indian emigrants to the United States
IIT Delhi alumni
ETH Zurich alumni
Scientists from Schenectady, New York
1984 births
Living people